The Deva Spark is an adventure module for the 2nd edition of the Advanced Dungeons & Dragons fantasy role-playing game.

Plot summary
The Deva Spark is a 32-page scenario for the Planescape setting.

Publication history
The Deva Spark was written by Bill Slavicsek and J.M. Salsbury, and published by TSR, Inc.

Reception
Rick Swan reviewed The Deva Spark for Dragon magazine #218 (June 1995). He commented that: "Nothing aggravates me more than an RPG adventure with a flabby climax; after slogging through a book's worth of fight scenes and dungeon crawls, I want to be dazzled. So bravo to The Deva Spark". Swan concluded by saying: "The final chapter is a knock-out, a sensational blend of surreal characters and obstacles, building to a climax of surprising impact. The rest of the trip's nothing to sneeze at either".

References

Planescape adventures
Role-playing game supplements introduced in 1994